Monstera cenepensis is a species of flowering plants in the family Araceae.

Description 
Hemiepiphytic with short internodes of 1.2 cm diam. Petioles are 48 cm long. Blades ovate, 43.5 × 18.5 cm.

Range 
The native range of Monstera cenepensis is north Peru.

References 

cenepensis